The Mymensingh cinema bombings were a coordinated bombing of four movie theaters that caused in the deaths of 27 people and injured over 200 others in Mymensingh, Bangladesh on 6 December 2002. The bombing was carried out by Jama’atul Mujahedeen Bangladesh.

Background
The attack happened two months after a circus and cinema were bombed in Satkhira, Bangladesh. The attacks took place while the anti-crime Operation Clean Heart was ongoing. Soldiers from the operation were involved in the rescue and first-aid efforts. After the explosions, a bomb was found in Gaibandha, Bangladesh.

Attack
The attacks took place following the Eid holidays, which meant the movie theaters were filled. On 6 December 2002 there were four simultaneous explosions in four different movie theaters.

Trial
In 2007, Bangladesh Police charged three people with the crime. It also dropped the names of 43 people from the investigation which were added during the Bangladesh Nationalist Party Government including members of then opposition party Bangladesh Awami League and journalist. As of 2017, there has been no verdict in the case and the victims have not received any compensation.

Reactions
The Prime Minister of Bangladesh, Khaleda Zia, blamed the opposition party Awami League and described it as a planned attack to destabilize the government.

References

2002 in film
2002 murders in Bangladesh
21st-century mass murder in Asia
Attacks on buildings and structures in Asia
Attacks on cinemas
December 2002 crimes
December 2002 events in Bangladesh
Explosions in 2002
Islamic terrorism in Bangladesh
Islamic terrorist incidents in 2002
Improvised explosive device bombings in Bangladesh
Mass murder in 2002
Massacres in Bangladesh
Cinema bombings
Terrorist incidents in Bangladesh in 2002
Terrorism in Bangladesh
Building bombings in Bangladesh